

Sri Dharmasastha Kshethram Choozhal 

The Sastha (Ayyappa) Temple in Choozhal which is a kerala border village situated in Kanyakumari District of Tamil Nadu.
The temple is located 1Km from Choozhal bus stop in Parassala- Poovar/Kollemcode road. Though the temple is in Tamil Nadu, it follows typical South Kerala rituals and it is managed and owned by Kalpazhamadom Choozhal.
The other deities worshiped in the temple are Ganapathy and Nagaraja.

Temple Puja 
It is open during the Mandalakalam, Makaravilakku Pooja, all saturdays, every Uthram nakshathram day (Pakkanal of Ayyapan), Ayilyam and the other important dates as per the Hindu Calendar.

The Temple Puja timing is from 6Pm to 8pm however in some occasions the puja used to perform in Morning also.

Festival 
The temple festival is in Maakaravilakku which start on Maakaravilakku day and continue for another 10days. The festival starts with The Ponkala and followed by Special Pujas, Sapthaham.
On the Last day of the Festival, the Idol of the God Dharmasastha is taken out on a procession around the village in elephant followed by Arat. During the visit, devotees of the Village used to workship the God  with Thattapuja. The procession accompanied by Tharappoli and some cultural programmes.

Hindu temples in Kanyakumari district